Fengyang County is a county in north-central Anhui Province, China. It is under the administration of Chuzhou, a prefecture-level city. The county was home to 765,600 people as of 2013.

Administrative divisions
Fengyang County is divided into 14 towns and 1 township. The county seat is in Fucheng Town.

14 Towns 
The county is home to the following 14 towns:

1 Township 
The county's sole township is:
Huangwan.

Geography 
The county's northern border is formed by the Huai River and neighboring Wuhe County. The county is also home to the Huayuan Lake, which totals about 30 square kilometers in size.

Climate 
The average annual temperature for Fengyang County is 14.9 °C, and the average annual precipitation is 904.4 mm.

History

Pre-Ming Dynasty 

During the Xia, Shang and early Zhou dynasties, the Dongyi peoples inhabited this area and were collectively known as the Huaiyi after the Huai River. During the late Western Zhou Period and the early Spring and Autumn period, the Dongyi became increasingly sinicized and formed their own states. During the late Spring and Autumn period, the once-powerful Dongyi state of Xu was pressured from all directions and destroyed through a series of wars with its neighbors, such as the Chu State and the Wu State. Another Dongyi State was the small Zhongli State, which was a part of the Huaiyi Confederation led by the State of Xu. Tombs belonging to the royalty of the Zhongli State were discovered in excavations between 2005 and 2008 near Fengyang. Eventually, the Huaiyi peoples were either pushed south or assimilated.

Ming Dynasty 
Fengyang's best known historical site is linked with the name of the county's most famous native, Zhu Yuanzhang (1328-1398). Although coming from a poor family, he became an important rebel leader and, later, the founder of China's Ming Dynasty.  Once entrenched as the Hongwu Emperor in the nearby Nanjing, he honored the memory of his father, Zhu Wusi (d. 1344), and his mother, Lady Chen, by posthumously raising them to imperial dignity, and building for them an imperial-style mausoleum, known as Ming Huangling (literally, "Ming Imperial Mausoleum"). The emperor even started building the new imperial capital, named Zhongdu near his childhood hometown, but the project was eventually abandoned. The stone figures of the Huangling Mausoleum have survived, and have been re-erected at the original location, some south of the county seat (()). The mausoleum statuary and the remains of the capital-building project are protected as a national historic site known as "Zhongdu Imperial City of the Ming and the Imperial Mausoleum's Statuary". In 1370, existing counties in the area were merged into a new county, named Linhuai County.

Qing Dynasty 
In 1754, Linhuai County was restructured into a new county called Fengyang County, which serves as the descendant of the modern Fengyang County.

Recent History 
The county's borders are jurisdiction has changed numerous times since its Qing-era formation. From 1959 to 1960, during the Great Leap Forward, 60,245 people of the county died, occupying 17.7 percent to its total population of 335,698. 8,404 complete households were wiped out. 

In 1974, future Chinese Premier Li Keqiang was sent to Damiao, Fengyang County as part of Mao Zedong's Down to the Countryside Program. Here, he did manual labour throughout the day and studied for university, Li recounts his days in the county as "hard times". He rose up to the rank of Damiao's Communist Party branch secretary in 1976, before leaving for Peking University in 1978.

Economy 
Fengyang County's natural resources include limestone, quartz, marble, vermiculite, and asbestos.

Transportation 
Key highways in the county include the G36 Expressway, Anhui Provincial Highway 101, Anhui Provincial Highway 207, Anhui Provincial Highway 307, and Anhui Provincial Highway 310. The Beijing-Shanghai High Speed Rail also passes through the county.

See also
Fengyang Flower Drum, a famous folk song genre from Fengyang County
Ming Ancestral Tomb, the tomb of Zhu Yuanzhang's grandfather, great-grandfather, and great-great-grandfather
Xiaogang, Anhui, a village in Xiaoxihe town

References

Chuzhou
County-level divisions of Anhui